The Mythical Ark: Adventures in Love & Happiness is a 2013 Chinese animated film part of the film series based on the animated television series Pleasant Goat and Big Big Wolf. It is preceded by Mission Incredible: Adventures on the Dragon's Trail (2012) and is followed by Meet the Pegasus (2014).

Plot 
Wolffy invents "Weather control" to capture goats but end up losing control of wind, rain, thunder and lightning. Thereby, Green-Green Grassland suffers a lot from the changeable weather. In order to initiate the ark to take the Green-Green Grassland residents away from disaster, the goats start their journey of finding a snake tribe that has been missing for thousand years. It takes them a while to notice that their new friend Bieber is exactly the extinct snake. Luckily, tribes work together to solve the weather chaos despite their differences and save the Green-Green Grassland.

Reception
The film grossed RMB125 million (US$20.7 million) at the Chinese box office.

References

External links

2013 films
Chinese animated films
2013 animated films
Pleasant Goat and Big Big Wolf films